The Church of the Archangels Michael and Gabriel is a Romanian Orthodox church in Plopiș village, Șișești Commune, Maramureș County, Romania. Built in 1798, it is one of eight buildings that make up the wooden churches of Maramureș UNESCO World Heritage Site, and is also listed as a historic monument by the country's Ministry of Culture and Religious Affairs.

References

Plopis
Churches completed in 1798
18th-century Eastern Orthodox church buildings
Plopis
Romanian Orthodox churches in Romania
Former Greek-Catholic churches in Romania
18th-century churches in Romania